Paralytic peptides are a family of short (23 amino acids) insect peptides that halt metamorphosis of insects from larvae to pupae. These peptides contain one disulphide bridge. The family includes growth-blocking peptide (GBP) of Mythimna separata (Oriental armyworm) and the paralytic peptides from Manduca sexta (tobacco hawkmoth), Heliothis virescens (noctuid moth), and Spodoptera exigua (beet armyworm)  as well as plasmatocyte-spreading peptide (PSP1).

References

Protein families
Protein toxins
Peptides